De noche: Clásicos a mi manera... is the name of the second compilation album (and seventeenth overall) by Mexican singer Alejandro Fernández. It was released on 2 December 2008 under the Sony BMG Norte label. It has 16 cover songs by classic Mexican composers such as Agustín Lara, Roberto Cantoral, and Armando Manzanero, over half of which were previously released on the Grandes Éxitos a la Manera de Alejandro Fernández album in 1994. It also includes four new tracks recorded specifically for the album.

Track listing

CD

Charts

Weekly charts

Year-end charts

References

Alejandro Fernández compilation albums
2008 compilation albums
Spanish-language compilation albums
Sony Music compilation albums